Law of the North is a 1932 American Western film directed by Harry L. Fraser and starring Bill Cody, Andy Shuford and Nadine Dore. It was the penultimate Monogram Pictures eight-film Western film series "the Bill and Andy series", with Bill Cody co-starring with child actor Andy Shuford.

Plot
Bill Roberts is presumed to have murdered a man when he is found near the body and flees from his pursuers. He surrenders but finds that Judge Hanley is very keen to have him hung as soon as possible. The body of the supposedly murdered man vanishes with the judge finding himself pursued by the "Law of the North".

Main cast
 Bill Cody as Bill Roberts 
 Andy Shuford as Andy 
 Nadine Dore as Laura 
 William L. Thorne as Judge Hanley 
 Al St. John as Jailbird 
 Heinie Conklin as Jailbird 
 Gilbert Pratt as Sheriff 
 Jack Carlyle as Jack

References

Bibliography
 Pitts, Michael R. Western Movies: A Guide to 5,105 Feature Films. McFarland, 2012.

External links
 

1932 films
1932 Western (genre) films
1930s English-language films
American Western (genre) films
Films directed by Harry L. Fraser
Monogram Pictures films
Films with screenplays by Harry L. Fraser
1930s American films